The Stories of John Cheever is a 1978 short story collection by American author John Cheever. It contains some of his most famous stories, including "The Enormous Radio", "Goodbye, My Brother", "The Country Husband", "The Five-Forty-Eight" and "The Swimmer". It won the Pulitzer Prize for Fiction and the National Book Critics Circle Award in 1979 and its first paperback edition won a 1981 National Book Award.

Stories

Notes

References

External links
 Photos of the first edition of The Stories of John Cheever
 Paul Gray, "Inescapable Conclusions" (review), Time, October 16, 1978

1978 short story collections
American short story collections
Pulitzer Prize for Fiction-winning works
Short story collections by John Cheever
Alfred A. Knopf books
National Book Award for Fiction winning works